, also known by the title of its anime adaptation, is a Japanese manga series by Hekiru Hikawa that uses parody, frequently referencing Japanese and American pop-culture in many ways. It features several first year students and their teachers in a school in Japan, though the main focus is on class 1-C. The manga was serialized in Square Enix's G Fantasy between the November 2000 and October 2011 issues, and the chapters are collected in 17 tankōbon volumes.

A 26-episode anime television series adaptation aired in Japan on TV Tokyo between July 4 and December 26, 2005 with its title renamed as Pani Poni Dash!. The anime is licensed by Funimation in North America. There have also been several drama CDs created based on the TV series and manga. A special OVA was released with a DVD box set containing the anime series on April 15, 2009 in Japan.

Plot

Pani Poni Dash!'''s central storyline revolves around Rebecca Miyamoto, a child prodigy homeroom teacher, and the antics of her class 1-C. The characters attend a high school called the  where Rebecca has taken up a job as one of the teachers after being the youngest graduate at MIT and is being watched by space aliens who screw up the story every now and then. Though the story hardly strays from the focus of the four first-year classes labeled 1-A through 1-D, the mishaps that occur in them, the teacher's lounge, and on school trips also become sources of material for topical allusions regarding satire, anime, Internet, gaming, and popular culture.

Media

MangaPani Poni was serialized in the manga magazine G Fantasy published by Square Enix between the November 2000 and October 2011 issues. Seventeen volumes were released in Japan. The translated versions of the manga are also released in Taiwan and South Korea, from Chingwin Publishing Group in Taipei and Haksan Culture Company in Seoul.

There are four spin-offs of original Pani Poni manga. Most of them features yonkoma style.  is currently serialized in Tech Gian (Enterbrain) from July 2001, and focuses on Hikaru Nikaido (class 1-A) as a heroine.  was serialized in Dengeki Moeoh between March 2002 and June 2008. It featured Kurumi Momose (1-C) as a heroine and illustrated her part-time job on a cafe. It described the fictional Japanese idol group named Momo-gumi!! that Yuna Kashiwagi (1-A) belongs to.  is alternately serialized in G Fantasy with Pani Poni from August 2006. It shows how Behoimi (1-D) became a "real" magical girl, and fights against the invaders from other planets.

Drama CDsPani Poni has also created ten drama CDs based on the series, the first of which was released in Japan on February 27, 2004. While the first seven preceded the anime, and thus were based on the manga version, the last three released have been based on the anime adaptation.

Anime

An anime television series adaptation titled Pani Poni Dash! aired in Japan between July 4 and December 26, 2005, and contained 26 episodes. King Records subsidiary Starchild has the video and music rights for the anime. A special OVA was released with a DVD box set containing the anime series, on April 15, 2009. A Blu-ray box set of the series including the OVA was released in Japan on April 26, 2017. The anime was licensed Funimation in North America (it was once licensed by ADV Films for $138,666 effective June 30, 2006; however, through a fallout of ADV's license partner Sojitz/ARM Corporation, Pani Poni was transferred to Funimation), ADV Films in the United Kingdom, Mighty Media in Taiwan, and TVee.co.kr in South Korea. Funimation released a complete DVD box set on March 10, 2009.

The episode names are based on adages and proverbs. Each episode is only loosely connected to the central plot. Many of the jokes in the series rely on satire, established character behavior, Japanese Internet and anime culture such as emoticons (At some points in the series, a character's face is replaced by an emoticon.), or non sequitur comments and actions (especially by Ichijo). The series also contains numerous parodies and references to popular culture, which include Planet of the Apes, Star Trek, The Exorcist, Gundam, Devilman, Super Mario Bros., Little Black Sambo, Usagi Yojimbo, Doctor Who and the Cthulhu Mythos.

Music
Opening themes
 by Peach Moon Academy Class 1-C (feat. Himeko in TV episodes 2–9, 14, DVD episodes 1–8, 25 and OVA; feat. Rei in TV episodes 11, 13, 16; feat. Kurumi in TV episode 17 and DVD episode 15; feat. Rokugō in TV episodes 19, 22)
 by Peach Moon Academy Class 1-C (feat. Ichijo in TV episodes 10, 12, 15, 18 and DVD episodes 9-14, 16)
 by Peach Moon Academy Class 1-C (feat. Miyako in TV episodes 20–21, 23 and DVD episodes 17–23; feat. Rokugō in TV episode 24 and DVD episode 24)
Ending themes
 by Peach Moon Academy Class 1-A&B (in TV and DVD episodes 1–7, 9-12)
 by Behoimi (in TV and DVD episodes 8)
 by Rebecca Miyamoto (in TV and DVD episodes 13, 25)
 by Peach Moon Academy Class 1-D (in TV and DVD episodes 14-23 and OVA)
 by Rebecca Miyamoto (in TV and DVD episode 24)
 by Peach Moon Academy Class 1-C (feat. Himeko in TV and DVD episode 26)

The first one was aired from November 2005 to February 2006, while the latter one was aired from December 2005 to September 2006, both on Animate TV. The shows were hosted by Mai Kadowaki and Chiwa Saito who played Behoimi (1-D) and Rebecca "Becky" Miyamoto in the anime respectively.

While the latter one was remixed as "DJCD"s, the former has never been officially released.

Notes

References
General

Specific

External links

Manga official website 
Anime official website 
Pani Poni Dash! anime at TV Tokyo 
Pani Poni Dash! anime at Funimation

2000 manga
2005 anime television series debuts
2009 anime OVAs
ADV Films
Funimation
Gangan Comics manga
Parody anime and manga
School life in anime and manga
Shaft (company)
Shōnen manga